Axon is an English surname. Notable people with this surname include the following:

 Annemarie Carney Axon, American judge
 David Axon (1951–2012), British astrophysicist
 John Axon (1900–1957), English engine driver awarded the George Cross
 John Axon (actor) (1960–2008), English actor; grandson of John Axon the engine driver
 Rachael Axon (b. 1985), English footballer
 William Axon (1846–1913), English antiquary

English-language surnames